The Western Canada League was the name of three different baseball circuits in Minor League Baseball that operated between 1907 and 1921.

The first instance of the league was a Class D circuit that played only in 1907 with four teams sponsored by four cities. The second instance was also a Class D league, which ran from 1909 through 1914 with 11 different cities represented in its six years of existence. The third instance started with four teams at the Class C level in 1919, expanded to six teams in Class B in 1920, and subsequently folded after the 1921 season.

1907

Cities represented/Teams

1909-1914

Cities represented/Teams

1919-1921

Cities represented/Teams

Champions

Hall of Fame alumni
 Heinie Manush

Notable players

Sources
 Baseball Reference minor leagues

Defunct baseball leagues in Canada